Thembekile Kimi Makwetu (died 11 November 2020) was a South African Chartered accountant. He served as the Auditor-General of South Africa between 2013 and 2020.

Education
Makwetu was born in Cape Town, South Africa on the 7th of January 1966. Matriculated in 1984 from St Johns College in Umtata. In 1989, he graduated with a degree in Social Sciences from the University of Cape Town. After receiving a BCompt Honours degree from the University of Natal in 1997, he qualified as a chartered accountant.

Career
He took a job with Standard Bank, and would go on to work at Nampak. He completed his articles of clerkship at Deloitte. He later went on to work for Metropolitan Life in Western Cape and for Liberty Life in Gauteng, before becoming a director in Deloitte's forensic unit. In 2007, he joined the Auditor-General's office as Deputy Auditor-General under Terence Nombembe.

Auditor-General
On 1 December 2013, South African President Jacob Zuma appointed Makwetu Auditor-General of South Africa for a seven-year term. In February 2014 Makwetu drew attention to what he described as "wasteful and irregular" government spending. A later report from Makwetu in November 2015 said there had been a "slight improvement".

Death
Makwetu died from lung cancer on 11 November 2020. His term as Auditor-General was set to expire on 30 November. He will be replaced by his deputy, Tsakani Maluleke.

See also
 Comptroller and Auditor General

References

External links
 *Website of the Auditor-General

South African accountants
South Africa
2020 deaths
Deaths from lung cancer
Deaths from cancer in South Africa